Yekta Naser (born November 3, 1978 in Tehran) is an Iranian actress and model.

Early life
Yekta Naser has received a Crystal Simorgh for Best Actress in a Supporting Role at the 30th Fajr International Film Festival for her performance in Someone Wants to Talk to You (2011).

She has appeared in several TV series such as Stay with Me (2000), The First Night of Peace (2005), The Daughters of Eve (2012), and The Old Road (2015).

She has also taken part in various movies, including Murder Online (2005), Someone Wants to Talk to You (2011) and I Am Not Salvador (2015).

Filmography
 2001 - Saghi
 2005 - Farari 
 2005 - The Birthday Chant 
 2008 - Shirin
 2012 - Sobhaneh (short)
 2015 -  I Am Not Salvador
 2018 - Rahman 1400
 2019 - Del
 2021 - Neysan Abi
2022 - Shabe Talaei

References

External links
 

Iranian film actresses
1978 births
Living people
21st-century Iranian actresses
Actresses from Tehran
Crystal Simorgh for Best Supporting Actress winners